The CMLL Japan Women's Championship, also known as the CMLL Japanese Women's Championship, is a women's professional wrestling championship, promoted by the Mexican lucha libre promotion Consejo Mundial de Lucha Libre (CMLL) and Japanese joshi puroresu promotion Lady's Ring. Dalys la Caribeña is the current champion, the fourth overall champion and the first since the championship was reactivated in 2020. She won the championship on January 22, 2020, where Dalys defeated Mina Shirakawa in a best two-out-of-three falls match to win the title.

The championship was first introduced in 1999 as the CMLL Japan Women's Championship, when CMLL was touring Japan in hopes of expanding into the Japanese market. By 2000 CMLL ceased promoting shows regularly in Japan, loaning the CMLL Japan Women's Championship to Osaka Pro Wrestling, who kept promoting the championship until June 2001. Inaugural champion Chikako Shiratori is, thus far, the only woman to have won the championship on two occasions.

Background
Lucha libre, or professional wrestling, is a form of entertainment where matches are presented as being competitive, but the outcome of the matches are pre-determined by their promoters. As part of presenting lucha libre as a genuine combat sport, promoters create championships that are used in the storylines presented on their shows, they are not won as a result of genuinely competitive matches. The championship is represented by a belt for the champion to wear before or after a match.

In 1999, CMLL began to tour Japan, promoting a series of wrestling shows under the name "CMLL Japan". The shows featured a mixture of CMLL and Japanese wrestlers. CMLL partnered with smaller Japanese promotions such as Osaka Pro Wrestling (OPW) for these shows, as well as freelance Japanese wrestlers. As part of their efforts to establish themselves in Japan, CMLL introduce three CMLL Japan championships, the CMLL Japan Super Lightweight Championship, the CMLL Japan Tag Team Championship, and the CMLL Japan Women's Championship.

In 2020, CMLL began working with the newly founded Japanese, all-female "Lady Ring" promotion. CMLL had previously collaborated with Universal Woman's Pro Wrestling Reina and Reina X World/Reina Joshi Puroresu for all-female shows and recognized the CMLL-Reina International Championship and the CMLL-Reina International Junior Championship but the collaboration would later end, with CMLL withdrawing their recognition of the championships. When the Lady's Ring collaboration was announced CMLL revealed that they were bringing back the CMLL Japan Women's Championship after 19 years of inactivity.

History
The CMLL Japan Women's Championship was unveiled on October 17, 1999, on a show in Osaka, Japan. Chikako Shiratori defeated Lady Apache, in a best-of-five match series to become the inaugural champion. Her initial reign lasted until sometime in November 1999 where La Diabólica won the title on a CMLL Japan show in Tokyo. La Diabólica's reign lasted only a matter of weeks before Shiratori regained the championship on November 25, 1999, in Kyoto, Japan. The CMLL Japan Women's Championship was actively defended in Japan after CMLL stopped touring. Shiratori's last documented championship defense took place on January 7, 2001, where she defeated Policewoman to retain the title. When Shiratori retired in June 2001, the CMLL Japan Women's Championship was also retired. On January 22, 2020, CMLL and Lady's Ring held their second joint show, Numero Dos, where the main event saw CMLL representative Dalys la Caribeña defeat Lady's Ring representative Mina Shirakawa in a best two-out-of-three falls match to win the reactivated championship.

Reigns
Dalys la Caribeña is the current champion, in her first reign. Her reign is the fourth overall reign and she is the third person to hold the championship. La Diabólica's reign lasted between 1 and 25 days and is the shortest reign on record. Shiratori's second reign lasted 561 days, the longest of any of the championship reigns. Daily was originally announced as defending the CMLL Japan Women's Championship at the 2020 Homenaje a Dos Leyendas against Princesa Sugehit. This would have been the first time the championship had been defended in Mexico, but the show was canceled due to the effects of the COVID-19 pandemic.

Title history

Original version

Revived version

Combined reigns (overall)

References 

Consejo Mundial de Lucha Libre championships
Women's professional wrestling championships